The Men's 49er was a sailing event on the Sailing at the 2016 Summer Olympics program in Rio de Janeiro and took place between 12–18 August at Marina da Glória. 13 races (the last one a medal race) were held.

The medals were presented by Barbara Kendall, IOC member, New Zealand and Adrienne Greenwood, Vice President of World Sailing.

Schedule

Results

References 
 

Men's 49er
49er (dinghy)
Men's events at the 2016 Summer Olympics